is a Japanese singer and actress formerly associated with the Japanese idol girl group NGT48 and former member of AKB48 and SKE48. She debuted in 2008 in Team A and was later co-captain of Team K (2014). In March 2015, it was announced Kitahara would be transferred to NGT48 as captain of the group. She has sung on many of the groups' main singles, having been voted number 13, 16, 13, 13, 21, 19, 11 and 12 in  AKB48's General Elections. In 2017, for her final participation, she was voted number 10 which is her best rank ever. 
Since 2011, Kitahara is also a member of the AKB48 subgroup Not Yet.

She is currently represented with Ohta Production.

Biography 
Kitahara was born in Ichinomiya, Aichi. In 2009, she was placed 13th overall in AKB48's general election to determine the participants in its next single.

On August 13, 2010, Kitahara debuted as a voice actress in the anime series Gakkō no Kowai Uwasa: Shin Hanako-san ga Kita!!.

In AKB48's 2012 general election, Kitahara placed 13th with 26,531 votes. She made her acting debut in the movie Graffreeter Toki, which was released on July 14, 2012 in Japan. At the end of the year, she was a cast member on the first season of the reality television show Terrace House: Boys × Girls Next Door, where she lived together with five other people.

On August 24, 2012, the first day of AKB48's 3-Tokyo-Dome-concert series, the group announced a reorganization, which placed Kitahara from Team B to Team K, and also made her a concurrent member of AKB48 and SKE48. She debuted with Team S on February 13, 2013. She was transferred from Team S to Team KII, but did not debut with the new team.. In April, SKE48 announced it was ending Kitahara's concurrency with the group, which leaves her only with AKB48's Team K.

As a member of the sub-group Not Yet, she is credited for the lyrics of "Guilty Love" (part of the Suika Baby single)

Kitahara starred in the Japanese horror movie Joker Game, released on December 22, 2012. She also appeared in the drama remake, Kazoku Game, which aired on Fuji TV starting April 2013, as a girlfriend of a son of a prominent family member.

On August 21, 2017, she announced she will be leaving NGT48. She graduated on April 18, 2018.

On September 29, 2021, Kitahara announced her marriage to actor Hideyuki Kasahara.

Discography

Singles with AKB48

Singles with SKE48

Singles with NGT48

Filmography

Films
 Documentary of AKB48: To Be Continued (2011) - herself
 Documentary of AKB48: Show Must Go On (2012) - herself
 Graffreeter Toki (2012)
 The Joker Game (2012) - Chinatsu Akasawa
 Documentary of AKB48: No Flower Without Rain (2013) - herself
 Documentary of AKB48: The Time Has Come (2014) - herself
 9tsu no Mado (2016) - segment "Odenwa Arigatou Gozaimasu"
 Ninkyo Yaro (2016)
 Sunny/32 (2018)
 Toshimaen (2019)
 Kishiryu Sentai Ryusoulger The Movie: Time Slip! Dinosaur Panic!! (2019)
 Rise of the Machine Girls (2019)
 Hero 2020 (2020)
 Trap Girl (2021)

Dramas 
 Majisuka Gakuen (2010) - Unagi 
 Majisuka Gakuen 2 (2011) -  Unagi
 Rokudenashi Blues (2011) - Kazumi Mai
 Shiritsu Bakaleya Koko (2012) - Momoko
 Majisuka Gakuen 3 (2012, ep1,12) - prisoner
 Kazoku Game (2013) - Asuka Mogami
 AKB Horror Night: Adrenaline's Night Ep.29 - Prenatal care (2016) - Mizuki 
 AKB Love Night: Love Factory Ep.5 - Grilled Meat Date (2016) -  Moeno
 Higurashi No Naku Koro Ni (2016) - Takano Miyo
 Sherlock: Untold Stories (2019, ep. 11) - Hitomi Kasuga

TV movies
 Minna! Esupa Dayo! Bangaihen - Esupa, Miyako e Iku (2015) - Shizuka Tachibana

Anime 
 Gakkō no Kowai Uwasa: Shin Hanako-san ga Kita!!. (2010)

Variety shows 
 AKBingo!
 Naruhodo High School
 AKB 600sec.
 AKB-Kyuu Gourmet Stadium
 AKB48+10
 AKB 1/48
 AKB to XX!
 Bimyo-na Tobira AKB48 no GachiChallenge
 AKB48 Nemōsu TV (AKB48ネ申テレビ?)
 Terrace House: Boys × Girls Next Door
 AKB Kousagi Dojo
 AKB48 no Anta, Dare? 
 HKT48 vs. NGT48 Sashikita Gassen
 NGT48 no Niigata Furendo!

Radio shows 
 AKB48 no All Night Nippon
 PORT DE NGT
 NGT48 no Minna Kamitaiou!! Radio Akushukai!!

References

External links 

 AKB48 official profile 
 Ohta Pro profile  
 Oricon profile 
  
 

1991 births
Living people
People from Ichinomiya, Aichi
Japanese voice actresses
Japanese idols
AKB48 members
SKE48 members
NGT48 members
Musicians from Aichi Prefecture
21st-century Japanese women singers
21st-century Japanese singers
21st-century Japanese actresses